Kennel Peak is a small but notable rock peak, over  high, about  north of Rockney Ridge in the Demas Range of Marie Byrd Land, Antarctica. It was mapped by the United States Geological Survey from surveys and U.S. Navy air photos, 1959–69, and was named by the Advisory Committee on Antarctic Names for ionospheric physicist A. Alexander Kennel, who was Station Scientific Leader at South Pole Station in 1969.

References

Mountains of Marie Byrd Land